Wieslander is a Swedish surname. Notable people with the surname include:

Agnes Wieslander (1873–1934), Swedish painter
Hugo Wieslander (1889–1976), Swedish Olympic athlete
Ulla-Britt Wieslander (born 1942), Swedish Olympic sprinter

Swedish-language surnames